St Oswald's Church is a congregation of the Scottish Episcopal Church located in Maybole, Ayrshire, Scotland. The current Priest-in-Charge is The Rev. James Geen.

History
The congregation was established in 1847 by Rev. William Scot Wilson, then rector of Holy Trinity in Ayr, to serve the English and Irish weavers in the area. There was no permanent church; the congregation met in a room on Abbot Street and were served by clergy from Girvan.

In 1883, Wilson, who by then had been appointed Bishop of Glasgow and Galloway, agreed to the construction of a permanent church in 1883. St Oswald's Church was completed the same year and consecrated by Bishop Wilson on 18 December 1883.

St Oswald's Church contains one of the few remaining pipe organs in Maybole, manufactured in 1893 by Alfred Kirkland.

Previous rectors
1847-1911 Charge served from Girvan.
1911-1932 Charge served from Holy Trinity, Ayr.
1932-1934 Harry Rowley
1934-1941 Charge served from Holy Trinity, Ayr.
1941-1943 Thomas Veitch
1944-1947 Leonard David Barnes
1947-1949 William Howard Dale Chapman
1949-1952 Richard Claud Wylie
1952-1963 Ernest Jauncey
1963-1984 Charge served from Ayr.
1984-1995 Charge served from Girvan.
1995-2017 Charge served from Ayr.
2017- James William Geen

References

External link
 

Churches in South Ayrshire
Churches completed in 1883
Episcopal church buildings in Scotland
Religious organizations established in 1847
Maybole